The McAdams and Morford Building in Lexington, Kentucky, also known as the Melodeon Hall, is a 3-story commercial building constructed in 1849. An Italianate cast iron facade was added after 1857. Druggists McAdams & Morford occupied a corner space in the building 1898–1994.

The building was home to Lexington's Melodeon Hall, a theater and meeting space with seating for 300 patrons. Robert Jefferson Breckinridge addressed a gathering at the Melodeon in 1861, and his remarks helped to preserve Kentucky as a Union state during the American Civil War, although Kentucky maintained separate Union and Confederate state governments during the war.

The University of Kentucky (Transylvania University) Commercial College occupied the building for 35 years under the direction of Wilbur R. Smith. In 1908 the college was incorporated separately from the university as the Wilbur R. Smith Business College.

In 2017 a vehicle damaged the building, and repair workers uncovered arches from the cast iron facade that had been hidden by previous remodeling.

The McAdams and McFord logo appears on the cover of the 2000 album The Sickness from the nu-metal group, Disturbed.

References

External links
 
 200 West Main street, University of Kentucky Library Special Collections
 Melodeon Hall stage, 1977, Kentucky Photo Archive

Further reading
 The Value of One, Lexington History, June 4, 2009

National Register of Historic Places in Lexington, Kentucky
Italianate architecture in Kentucky
Commercial buildings completed in 1849
Commercial buildings on the National Register of Historic Places in Kentucky
1849 establishments in Kentucky
Commercial buildings in Lexington, Kentucky
Individually listed contributing properties to historic districts on the National Register in Kentucky